Eretmocera meyi is a moth of the family Scythrididae. It was described by Bengt Å. Bengtsson in 2014. It is found in Zimbabwe.

References

meyi
Moths described in 2014
Moths of Africa